Nikolay Vladinov (born 1 April 1987 in Vratsa) is a Bulgarian football player who plays as a forward and attacking midfielder.

References

Living people
1987 births
Bulgarian footballers
Association football forwards
PFC Lokomotiv Mezdra players
FC Botev Krivodol players
PFC Vidima-Rakovski Sevlievo players
FC Botev Vratsa players
PFC Minyor Pernik players
First Professional Football League (Bulgaria) players
Expatriate footballers in Switzerland
People from Vratsa